ICGV Freyja  is an offshore patrol vessel of the Icelandic Coast Guard. The ship is named after Freyja from Norse mythology and is the first Coast Guard vessel to bear the name of a goddess. Its homeport is Siglufjörður on the north coast of Iceland.

History
Formerly an offshore oil industry service ship named E.R.Vittoria and later GH Endurance, it was bought from United Offshore Support GmbH in September 2021 for 1.7 billion ISK to replace the 46-year old ICGV Týr. It arrived for retrofit in Rotterdam on 11 October and was formally delivered to the Coast Guard on 28 October the same year. It arrived at Siglufjörður on 6 November.

In December 2021, Freyja rescued the stranded trawler Masilik after it ran aground on Vatnsleysuströnd.

References

External links
Varðskipið Freyja
Official information on Icelandic Coast Guard website

2009 ships
Patrol vessels of Iceland
Freyja